The Second Central Research Institute of the Ministry of Defence of the Russian Federation is a Russian Ministry of Defence research institute in Tver, the administrative center of Tver Oblast, Russia. It enagages in aerospace research, including air defense systems.

It suffered a serious fire in April 2022, which killed six people and injured 27. Numerous news sites noted that the fire happened on the same day as the unexplained fire at the Dmitrievsky Chemical Plant in Kineshma.

References 

Research institutes in Russia
Buildings and structures in Tver Oblast
Russian Space Forces
Institutes of Russian Ministry of Defense
Research institutes established in 1935
Research institutes in the Soviet Union
1935 establishments in the Soviet Union